The Agricultural Act of 1948 (Pub.L. 80-897, 62 Stat. 1247) was enacted by the United States Congress and signed into law by President Harry S. Truman on July 3, 1948. The legislation revised and authorized several aspects of U.S. agricultural policy and agricultural subsidies.

Summary
The Agricultural Act of 1948 enacted several agricultural policy reforms, including mandatory price supports for basic commodities at 90% of parity. It also mandated that in 1950, parity would begin to incorporate price averages of the previous ten years and the 1910-14 base period. The legislation also amended several provisions of the previously passed Agricultural Adjustment Act of 1938 (Pub.L. 75-430, 52 Stat. 31), including price support and marketing quotas for corn, wheat, cotton, rice and tobacco. Title I of the law, which pertained to price stabilization, took effect immediately while Title II, which amended the Agricultural Adjustment Act of 1938, and Title III, which contained various miscellaneous provisions, both took effect on January 1, 1950.

References

External links
Full Text of Pub.L. 80-897, 62 Stat. 1247
Conference Report to Accompany Agricultural Act of 1948
House Report to Accompany Agricultural Act of 1948

1948 in law
United States federal agriculture legislation
United States federal commodity and futures legislation
80th United States Congress
United States federal welfare and public assistance legislation
1948 in the United States